The Comisión Nacional de los Mercados y la Competencia (English: National Commission on Markets and Competition), abbreviated as CNMC, is a Spanish independent competition regulator responsible for enforcing competition law. It was established by virtue of the Spanish Competition Act (Ley de Defensa de la Competencia or LDC, the competition defence act, of 3 July 2007). It was preceded by the Tribunal de Defensa de la Competencia (Competition Defense Court) until 1 September 2007.

Structure
President
 Luis Berenguer Fuster (until September 2011)
 Joaquín García Bernaldo de Quirós (2011- )

Members of the Council
 Pilar Sánchez Núñez
 Julio Costas Comesaña
 Jesús González López
 Inmaculada Gutiérrez Carrizo
 Luis Díez Martín

Directors for Investigations
 Carlos Pascual (until September 2008)
 Clara Guzmán Zapater (2008-)

Notable cases
In 2021, CNMC fined eight companies including Siemens, Nokia and ACS Group a combined 127.3 million euros ($148 million) for allegedly rigging public contracts valued at 4.1 billion euros for rail-signalling systems between 2002 and 2017.

In 2022, CNMC fined six leading construction firms – Dragados (part of ACS Group), Fomento de Construcciones y Contratas, Ferrovial, Acciona, Obrascón Huarte Lain, and Sacyr – a total of 204 million euros ($208 million) for colluding between 1992 and 2017 in submitting bids for public projects, such as roads and airports. Their collusion was considered socially damaging as they affected thousands of construction bids published by public authorities in Spain, leading to fewer and lower quality bids and putting competing companies at an disadvantage.

In response to the 2021–2022 global energy crisis, CNMC lowered the financial burden on around 300 smaller Spanish electricity traders and direct electricity consumers when depositing collateral payments in an attempt to help them stay afloat.

See also
 Autorité de la concurrence (France)
 Bundeskartellamt (Germany)
 List of competition regulators
 List of telecommunications regulatory bodies
 Office of Fair Trading (United Kingdom)

References

Competition regulators
Consumer organisations in Spain
Regulation in Spain